A terminal degree is the highest-level college degree that can be achieved and awarded in an academic discipline or professional field. In other cases, it is a degree that is awarded because a doctoral-level degree is not available nor appropriate.

An earned academic (or research) doctorate such as a Ph.D.,  Ed.D. or D.B.A. is considered the terminal degree in most academic fields, as well as the most advanced degree possible, advancing the boundaries of human knowledge through research and dissertation defense, in the United States. However, professional doctorates may be considered terminal degrees within the professional degree track, even though they are prerequisites for research degrees, for example, Doctor of Medicine (MD) or Juris Doctor (JD) in the United States. The phrase "terminal degree" is used heavily in the United States, but is used less in other countries. The term is not generally used in the United Kingdom or Canada, for example, and its exact meaning varies somewhat between those areas and disciplines in which the term is used. In some countries there are degrees which are more advanced than the PhD, such as the higher doctorates in the United Kingdom and Russia, and the habilitation degree awarded in Germany and Austria.

Not all terminal degrees are doctorates. For example, in professional practice fields there are often terminal master-level degrees, some which are called doctorates e.g. MEng (Master of Engineering), MLArch standing for Master Landscape Architect or BEng for Engineers, MB (Bachelor of Medicine (UK)). Architecture was a discipline where the M.Arch was considered terminal as a professionally oriented degree, but a Doctor of Architecture (D.Arch) that is recognized by the National Architectural Accrediting Board (NAAB) establishes the doctoral level as the highest level of "professional degree" in architecture in the United States.  For the same discipline of Architecture, the "Laurea di Dottore" is the terminal degree in Italy. Interior design and Interior Architecture have terminal master-level degrees such as MID, MA, MS interior design education. Most non-doctoral degrees are not terminal in academic terms, with the exception of the Master of Fine Arts (MFA), an academically recognized terminal degree given to practitioners in the fine arts and performing arts. The Master of Business Administration (MBA) is also considered a terminal professional degree.

Research degrees 

In academic fields, the typical terminal degree is that of Doctor of Philosophy, although others also exist.  The first phase of the Ph.D. consists of coursework in the student's field of study and requires one to three years to complete. This is often followed by a preliminary or comprehensive examination and/or a series of cumulative examinations, in which the emphasis is on breadth rather than depth of knowledge. Finally, another two to four years is usually required for the composition of a substantial and original contribution to human knowledge embodied in a written dissertation that in the social sciences and humanities is typically 250 to 450 pages in length. Dissertations generally consist of (i) a comprehensive literature review, (ii) an outline of methodology, and (iii) several chapters of scientific, social, historical, philosophical, or literary analysis. Typically, upon completion, the candidate undergoes an oral examination, sometimes public, by his or her supervisory committee with expertise in the given discipline.

Typical professional degrees, professional/clinical doctorates, and research doctorates 
 Arts:
 Doctor of Arts (DA)
 Doctor of Music (DM or DMus)
 Doctor of Musical Arts (DMA) (Usually awarded to performance majors in the musical arts)
 Doctor of Modern Languages (DML)
 Doctor of Philosophy (Ph.D. or DPhil)
 Doctor of Professional Studies (DPS)
 Master of Fine Arts (MFA)
 Master of Arts (MA)

 Design:
 Master of Art and Design (MAD)
 Master of Architecture (M.Arch)
 Doctor of Architecture (D.Arch)
 Doctor of Design (DDes)
 Master of Design (MDes)
 Master of Landscape Architecture (MLArch and/or MLA)
 Master of City Planning (MPLAN, MCRP, MUP, MCP, MCD or MURP)
 Master of Fine Arts (MFA)
 Master of Graphic Design (MGraph)
 Education:
 Doctor of Education (Ed.D.)
 Educational Specialist (EdS)
 Healthcare:
 Doctor of Acupuncture and Oriental Medicine (DAOM)
 Doctor of Athletic Training (DAT)
 Doctor of Behavioral Health (DBH)
 Doctor of Chiropractic (DC)
 Doctor of Clinical Nutrition (DCN)
 Doctor of Dental Surgery or Doctor of Dental Medicine (DDS or DMD)
 Doctor of Healthcare Administration (DHA)
 Doctor of Health Science (DHS, DHSc)
 Doctor of Medicine (MD)
 Doctor of Medical Physics (DMP)
 Doctor of Nurse Anesthesia Practice (DNAP)
 Doctor of Nursing Practice (DNP)
 Doctor of Occupational Therapy (DOT or OTD)
 Doctor of Optometry (OD)
 Doctor of Osteopathy (DO)
 Doctor of Pharmacy (PharmD)
 Doctor of Physical Therapy or Physiotherapy (DPT or DPhysio)
 Doctor of Podiatric Medicine (DPM)
 Doctor of Psychology (PsyD)
 Doctor of Public Health (DrPH, DPH)
 Doctor of Science (DSc)
 Doctor of Social Science (DSocSci)
 Doctor of Social Work (DSW)
 Doctor of Veterinary Medicine (DVM)
 Law:
 Doctor of Canon Law (JCD)
 Juris Doctor or Doctor of Jurisprudence (JD)
 Doctor of Juridical Science (JSD/SJD) (in the U.S.)
 Doctor of Laws (LLD)
 Management:
 Doctor of Business Administration (DBA, DrBA)
 Doctor of Management (DMgt, DM)
 Master of Public Affairs (MPA)
 Master of Project Management (MPM)
 Doctor of Public Administration (DPA)
 Doctor of Economic Development (DED)
 Religion:
 Doctor of Divinity (D.D.)
 Doctor of Ministry (D.Min.)
 Doctor of Sacred Theology (S.T.D.)
 Doctor of Theology (Th.D. or D.Th.)
 Science and Engineering:
 Doctor rerum naturalium (Dr. rer. nat.)
 Doctor of Computer Science (DSc.Comp, DCS, D.C.Sc.)
 Doctor of Engineering (Dr.-Ing./DEng/Dr. Eng./EngD)
 Doctor of Science (Sc.D., D.Sc., S.D., or D.S.)
 Social Science:
 Doctor of Criminal Justice (DCJ) is a professional doctorate (terminal degree) that is awarded on the basis of advanced study and research in the field of criminal justice. Structurally, the Doctor of Criminal Justice differs from the Ph.D. in that the DCJ has, as noted above, at least a three year duration, with only one year equivalent on the dissertation, while an American Ph.D. in criminal justice would normally require a minimum of four years, with at least two years spent on the dissertation. The Doctor of Criminal Justice (DCJ) prepares the holder for research and academic positions. It also prepares the holder for professional positions in the American criminal justice system.
 Technology:
 Doctor of Information Technology (DIT)
 Master of Library and Information Science (MLIS, MLS, MSLS) (Given in the US, by an ALA accredited school or program.)

Professional degrees 

A professional degree is a degree that is required, often by law as in the case of medical and other clinical professions, that must be earned first before the holder of the degree can practice in the profession.  A speech-language pathologist, for example, must hold a master's degree in communicative disorders: speech-language pathology in order to practice.  However, an actor does not need a degree to act, even though there are degrees for acting available.  In some fields, especially those linked to a profession (such as medicine, law or teaching), a distinction is to be drawn between a professional degree, an advanced degree and terminal degree.  A first professional degree is generally required by law or custom to practice the profession without limitation.  An advanced professional degree provides further training in a specialized area of the profession. A first professional degree is an academic degree designed to prepare the holder for a particular career or profession, fields in which scholarly research and academic activity are not the profession, but rather the practice of the profession.  In many cases such as law, medicine and teaching, the first professional degree is also terminal, usually because no further advanced degree is required for practice in that field, even though more advanced academic degrees may exist.

Typical professional degree 
 Business:
 Accountant (MAcc, MAcy, MSAcy)
 Business Administration (MBA)
 Design:
 Architect (B.Arch, M.Arch, D.Arch)
 Architectural Engineer (B.A.E, M.A.E)
 Landscape Architect (BLA, MLA)
 Urban Planning (MPLAN, MCRP, MUP, MCP, MCD, MURP)
 Interior Design, Interior Architecture (BS, BFA, MFA, MID, MA, MS)
 Education or a bachelor's usable for teaching (BEd, BA, BME, BSE, BSocSc, BSc)
 Engineer (BE, BEng, MEng, BSE, BScEng, BASc)
 Healthcare:
Acupuncturist (MAcOM, DAcOM)
 Advanced Practice Nurse (DNP, DNAP, DNS, DNSc)
 Audiologist (MS, AuD)
 Chiropractor (DC)
 Health Administrator (MHA)
 School Counselor (M.A., M.S., M.Ed., M.Coun. [also M.C.], or Ph.D.)
 Mental Health Counselor (M.A., M.S., M.Ed., M.Coun. [also M.C.], or Ph.D.)
Medical Laboratory Scientist (MLS, CLS, MT)
Dentist (DMD, BDent, DDS, BDS, BDSc, BChD, CD, Cand.Odont., Dr.Med.Dent.)
Midwife (BMid, BScMid)
Nurse (BSN, MSN)
Occupational Therapist  (OTD, DrOT, MSOT, MA, MOT)
Optometrist (OD, B.Optom)
Pharmacist (BPharm, BScPhm, PharmB, MPharm, Pharm.D.)
Physical Therapist (DPT, DPhysio, MPT, MSPT, MPhysio, BSPT, BPT, BPhysio)
Physician or Surgeon (M.D., D.O., MBBS, MDCM, MBChB, BMed, Dr.Med, Dr.MuD, Cand.med).
Physician Assistant (MPAS, MPS, MS, PGDip)
Podiatrist (DPM, DP, PodD, BPod, PodB)
Psychologist (PhD, PsyD, ClinPsyD or EdS)
Public Health (MPH)
Radiation Therapist (BSc, BRad)
Radiographer (BSc, BMRSc, BRad)
Respiratory Therapist (MSRC, BSRT)
Scientist (BSc, BS)
Social Worker (BSW, BA, BSc)
Speech and Language Therapist (MA, MS)
Veterinarian (DVM, VMD, BVS, BVSc, BVMS)
 Lawyer (LL.B., J.D.)
 Minister (M.Div.)

Advanced professional degrees

 Education (MEd, MAT, MT, EdS)
 Engineering (MEng, MASc, MMSc, PD)
 Healthcare:
 Acupuncture (DAcOM)
 Advanced Practice Registered Nurse (APRN: CRNA, NP, CNM, CNS) (DNP, DNAP, DNS, DNSc)
 Biotechnology (ALM)
 Dental Science (DDSc, Dr.Odont) (advanced degree in countries that award a bachelor's degree in dental surgery as first professional degree, usually awarded for outstanding research to a particular field of Dentistry)
 Dentistry (MDS, MSD, MDSc, or DClinDent) (these are usually granted at the culmination of a specialty training program in dentistry in those programs that also require research and a thesis to be completed)
 Medicine (MD/DO) (advanced degree in countries that award a bachelor's degree in medicine or surgery as first professional degree, usually awarded for outstanding research to a particular field of Medicine)
 Midwifery (MMid, MScMid)
 Nursing Practice (DNP)
 Surgery (MS, MSurg, MCh, ChM, or MChir)  (Usually granted after completion of surgery training program in conjunction with a research thesis)
 Psychology (PsyD)
 Social Science (PhD, DPhil)
 Social Work (MSW, DSW, ProfD or PhD)
 Lawyer (LLM, JSD, PhD)
 Ministry (DMin)
 Public Policy (MPP)
 Public Administration (MPA)

See also 
Professional degree
Professional school

References 

Doctoral degrees
Academic degrees of the United States